The Squadron Supreme is a superhero team appearing in American comic books published by Marvel Comics, of which there are several notable alternate versions. The original team was created by Roy Thomas and John Buscema, derived from the previously created supervillain team Squadron Sinister.

The core members of the Squadron Supreme are Hyperion, Nighthawk, Doctor Spectrum, Power Princess, and the Whizzer, pastiches of prominent members of rival publisher DC Comics' superhero team the Justice League. Many other characters were later added to the roster, not all of which were based on DC heroes.

Publication history
The Squadron Supreme has its roots in the Squadron Sinister, which first appeared in The Avengers #69 as a pastiche of the Justice League. Roy Thomas later introduced a heroic version of the Squadron Sinister named the Squadron Supreme, which first appeared in The Avengers #85–86 (Feb.–March 1971), and which was co-created with John Buscema. The team then had guest appearances on several more occasions, and in 1985 was featured in a self-titled twelve-issue limited series by Mark Gruenwald, with a divergent version of the Scarlet Centurion known as Victorex Prime serving as the main antagonist, followed in 1989 by a graphic novel sequel by Gruenwald, Ryan and inker Al Williamson, Squadron Supreme: Death of a Universe, in which the Nth Man serves as the main antagonist.

In 2003, a reimagined Squadron Supreme appeared in an ongoing series entitled Supreme Power, published under the mature-audience MAX imprint. This version was created by writer J. Michael Straczynski and artist Gary Frank.

Yet another Squadron Supreme was introduced in 2015, written by James Robinson and drawn by Leonard Kirk. Unlike the previous teams, which had appeared in alternate realities, this team was based in Marvel's main "Earth-616" reality, although the team members were from a variety of alternate universes that had been destroyed in the aftermath of the 2015 Secret Wars event.

Another version of the Squadron Supreme, set in the Marvel Universe, was introduced by Jason Aaron in The Avengers vol. 8. The Squadron, created by Mephisto and led by Phil Coulson, acts as the US government's sanctioned superhero team in place of the Avengers. This version of the team is the focus of the Heroes Reborn storyline, where reality is overwritten so that the Avengers were never formed and the Squadron Supreme are Earth's premier superhero team instead.

Fictional team biography

Earth-712 version
The Squadron Supreme are first encountered by four members of the Avengers – the Vision, Quicksilver, the Scarlet Witch and Goliath – who have arrived in the Earth-712 universe by mistake. The Avengers are initially confused, since several members of the Squadron Supreme have identical names and powers to the Squadron Sinister, a group of previously encountered villains. After a brief battle, the Avengers assist the Squadron Supreme against the global threat posed by the mutant Brain-Child, before returning to their own universe. The Squadron Supreme have another series of skirmishes with the Avengers engineered by the group the Serpent Cartel, but eventually they join forces and prevent the use of the Serpent Crown.

The team features briefly in the title Thor, when the evil version of Hyperion attacks the Earth-712 version and then the Earth-616 Thor. The Squadron appear in the title The Defenders as mind-controlled pawns of the entities the Over-Mind and Null the Living Darkness, but are freed and aid the Defenders in defeating the villains. Earth-712, however, is left in a post-apocalyptic state.

The Squadron Supreme were next featured in a self-titled 12-issue miniseries (Sept. 1985–Aug. 1986) by writer Mark Gruenwald, which picks up from where Earth-712 was last seen in The Defenders #114. The Squadron, led by Hyperion, believe they have the knowledge and power to recreate the world and create a utopia. Nighthawk protests, believing that the Squadron should serve and not rule. The issue is put to a vote, with the so-called "Utopia Program" favored by the majority of the Squadron; Nighthawk, unable to agree with the decision in clear conscience, resigns from the team. The Squadron assume overall control of the government of the United States and remake the nation into a virtual utopia. The team implement a series of sweeping changes, including revealing their secret identities; instituting a program of behavior modification in prisons where inmates are forced to submit to a process that mentally inhibits their criminal instincts; enforcing a strict gun control policy; and developing medical technology to cryogenically preserve the dead, while opposed by the future dictator (and usurper) of mankind Victorex Prime (formerly the Scarlet Centurion), serving as the main antagonist.

Despite the economic and technological advances, there are setbacks: the Golden Archer abuses the behavior modification technology by forcing fellow member Lady Lark to love him, resulting in his eventual removal from the team;The Amphibian becomes increasingly disgusted with the Squadron's methods and abandons the surface world altogether; Nuke inadvertently kills his parents via unnoticed and uncontrollable release of radiation and dies while battling Doctor Spectrum during a rampage; and Tom Thumb discovers he has cancer but chooses not to inform his teammates, eventually succumbing to the disease.

At one point, the team is attacked by the Institute of Evil, on the behalf of Victorex Prime. The Squadron ultimately defeats the Institute and uses the behavior modification technology to reform them, adding the former supervillains as members. Three of them die or are incapacitated.

In the meantime, Nighthawk forms a new team he calls the America Redeemers, recruiting former villains and several previously unknown superhumans. The later infiltrate the Squadron and kidnap the surviving Institute members to reverse the behavior modification on them. Despite mixed feelings on the parts of several of the Institute members, they too join the Redeemers. Former Squadron member the Golden Archer (now known as the Black Archer) also joins.

Eventually, the Redeemers confront the Squadron Supreme. A brutal battle ensues in which several members of both teams are killed, including Nighthawk. A horrified Hyperion realizes that Nighthawk was right: the Squadron, despite having good intentions, had inadvertently created a totalitarian state with themselves as its dictators. The Squadron surrenders, disbands and returns control of the United States to the government.

In a graphic novel sequel by Gruenwald, Ryan and inker Al Williamson, Squadron Supreme: Death of a Universe, remnants of the team and their former enemies (including Victorex Prime) reunite to battle the Nth Man. Although they succeed, several members of the Squadron are killed, with the remainder (Hyperion, Doctor Spectrum, the Whizzer, Power Princess, Lady Lark (now known as Skylark), Arcanna, Haywire, and the Shape) marooned in the mainstream Marvel universe.

The Squadron encounter the hero Quasar, and relocate to the government facility Project Pegasus. After another encounter with the Overmind and a visit to the laboratory world of the Stranger, the Squadron attempt unsuccessfully to return to their own universe and members Hyperion, Doctor Spectrum and the Whizzer battle the entity the Deathurge.

The entire Squadron Supreme appear in an Avengers storyline with the Avengers that finally returns them to their home universe. The one-shot issue Squadron Supreme: New World Order reveals that Earth-712 is now dominated by corporations using the Squadron's own utopia technologies.

The Squadron come into conflict with a new government when an interdimensional team called the Exiles, traveling from the Earth-616 universe, reveal that the government had rigged the election through worldwide vote fraud. The Squadron and the Exiles depose the new government and attempt to allow society to progress without superhuman involvement.

Earth-31916 version

Supreme Power
The series Supreme Power features the rebooted version of the superhero team Squadron Supreme and is set on Earth-31916.

Alien Hyperion arrives on Earth as an infant, and is taken into custody by the US government and raised in a controlled environment. Army Corporal Joseph Ledger is given a strange crystal removed from Hyperion's spaceship by the government that bonds to him, causing him to fall into a coma for years.

Discovering Hyperion has superhuman abilities, the government uses him as a secret weapon, and is eventually outed by the media. The government then announces and introduces Hyperion as a state-sponsored hero, which encourages other beings to appear, such as the Blur, who can move at superspeed. Ledger awakens and, harnessing the energy powers of the crystal, becomes Doctor Spectrum. Hyperion and Spectrum are initially hostile to one another and they battle, with Hyperion accessing lost memories when coming in contact with Spectrum's crystal. The Amphibian is seen on dry land for the first time, and Princess Zarda heals Hyperion after his battle. Nighthawk solicits the aid of Hyperion and the Blur to deal with a superpowered serial killer, who Hyperion now knows is actually the product of experimentation with his DNA.

Although successful, Hyperion is outraged by the government exploitation and leaves, warning that he has no wish to be contacted by humankind again. The government gathers the remaining superhumans into a team to capture Hyperion.

The story continues in the limited series Supreme Power: Hyperion with new Squadron members Emil Burbank, Arcanna, the Shape and Nuke tracking Hyperion to what they believe is an alternate reality. In this world, Hyperion and a version of the Squadron rule the world, with only Nighthawk and a small group of superhumans opposing their rule. Although the heroes locate the true Hyperion and convince him to return to their world, Burbank discovers that it was, in fact, not an alternate reality but their world two years from the present time.

Second Squadron Supreme title
The second volume of the series Squadron Supreme brings together all the superhumans (except a reluctant Nighthawk), who are split into two teams – one for international/public missions and another for covert operations. The President of the United States calls the group the Squadron Supreme. The Squadron meets with mixed success: an attempt to kill an African dictator is botched, and the target is murdered by local superhumans who state the group is not welcome in Africa, and a mission to Iran has member Inertia encouraging a victim to fight back and kill. 

China recruits Redstone, the superpowered serial killer created from Hyperion's DNA, in a bid to protect itself. The final issue is a battle to the death against Redstone (with the Blur recruiting Nighthawk to assist) who threatens to detonate a nuclear weapon. The outcome is not revealed, as the series concluded with issue #7.

Ultimate Power
An unrelated nine-issue series, Ultimate Power, written by J. Michael Straczynski; Brian Michael Bendis and Jeph Loeb with art by Greg Land, features the Squadron in a crossover into the Ultimate Universe. Courtesy of a deception engineered by Nick Fury and the Ultimate villain Doctor Doom, the Squadron travel to the Ultimate Universe, thinking that the Ultimate Reed Richards is responsible for releasing an organism that has destroyed much of the United States.

A series of misunderstandings ensues, and after a series of battles between the Squadron, the Ultimate Fantastic Four, the Ultimates and the Earth-712 Squadron Supreme (whose world was also affected by the organism), the third culprit is revealed as Burbank, who was asked by the government to develop a weapon to kill Hyperion. Nick Fury is detained in custody in the Earth-31916 universe, while Squadron member Power Princess remains in the Ultimate Universe to ensure that Doom (who escaped custody by using a Doombot) is captured.

Squadron Supreme: Hyperion vs. Nighthawk
An unrelated four-issue limited series, Squadron Supreme: Hyperion vs. Nighthawk, written by Marc Guggenheim and with art by Paul Gulacy, relates how Hyperion and Nighthawk, after an initial skirmish, join forces to try and alleviate the Darfur conflict in war-torn Sudan. Hyperion discovers Nighthawk has a prototype weapon built from stolen plans of Emil Burbank's journal that cannot actually injure him, but can convince him that he is being injured.

Third Squadron Supreme title
A third volume of the title Squadron Supreme, written by Howard Chaykin and with art by Greg Land (and other artists), is published, with the 12-issue series being set five years after the battle with Redstone. Most of the Squadron have disappeared, with Ultimate Nick Fury, Burbank and Arcanna now a team of intelligence officers working for the government and investigating a group of returning astronauts that exhibit strange abilities. The astronauts infect many people they come into contact with, also giving them superhuman abilities.

Fury eventually leads a new version of the Squadron that features characters who are pastiches of long-time Marvel characters. The group eventually come into conflict with many of the original members of the Squadron who have been gathered by Hyperion. The heroes unite to stop a group of superhuman terrorists from the Middle East, but then, via a government device, apparently all lose their abilities. Arcanna secretly reveals to Fury that she, and likely many others, still possesses superhuman abilities. Fury later returns to the Ultimate Universe.

Later appearances
Later, the members of the Squadron Supreme are apparently killed by Namor the Sub-Mariner and the Cabal after the villains raid the Squadron's universe. Versions resembling these characters later appear on the Battleworld created by Doctor Doom during the Secret Wars event, only to be killed again at the hands of the Squadron Sinister. Nighthawk is left as the group's only survivor.

Earth-616 version
This team, set in Marvel's mainstream reality, features characters from numerous alternate universes, such as the Nighthawk from Supreme Power, a Hyperion from a reality that had been destroyed upon colliding with another universe, Doctor Spectrum from the world of the Great Society (which was destroyed by Namor the Sub-Mariner to prevent it from colliding with the mainstream universe), the Blur from the New Universe, and Warrior Woman from a Secret Wars tie-in (posing as the Earth-712 Squadron Supreme's Power Princess).

The Squadron Supreme's first action was to get revenge on Namor for what happened to the worlds of some of its members. They attacked Atlantis where Hyperion beheaded Namor and Zarda killed Attuma. The fight ended with Hyperion lifting Atlantis above the ocean and throwing it onto the ground hard enough to kill the remaining Atlanteans present. The actions caused by the Squadron Supreme led the Avengers Unity Division to apprehend them before anyone else ends up killed by their hand. The Squadron Supreme were saved by Thundra and later teleported to Weirdworld, where they encounter Doctor Druid, who plans to mind-control Weirdworld's inhabitants. The Squadron Supreme shatter the crystal that Druid was using to enhance his mind control powers and return home. Power Princess remains on Weirdworld and reveals herself as Warrior Woman. Thundra sides with the Squadron Supreme, although she is unsure if she should help the Squadron Supreme protect the world or help protect the world from the Squadron Supreme.

Through Modred the Mystic's magical modifications to Reed Richard's time machine, Hyperion and Doctor Spectrum are accidentally transformed into ephemeral "ghosts" caught in the past; specifically during the Squadron's attack on Atlantis and just before Hyperion kills Namor. They decide to change the past by dragging this past Namor back to the present, thereby resurrecting him. Although this action is easy for Hyperion, who has had second thoughts about the cutthroat methods the Squadron Supreme has been using, it is more difficult for Doctor Spectrum, as Namor destroyed her Earth. At the end of the story arc, Hyperion leads the action to disband the Squadron, and the team goes their separate ways.

Squadron Supreme of America
When the Avengers become a global peacekeeping force, Thunderbolt Ross meets with Phil Coulson to discuss the matter. Phil reveals that he has established the Squadron Supreme of America as the newest United States superhero team. The team consists of Hyperion, Power Princess, Nighthawk, the Blur, and Doctor Spectrum as their leader.

With Doctor Spectrum as their leader, the Squadron Supreme of America were first used to fight Namor and his Defenders of the Deep when they attacked a Roxxon oil rig that is off the coast of Alaska.

Then the Squadron Supreme visited another oil platform in the Gulf of Mexico, where Doctor Spectrum used his powers to melt areas of the oil rig to secure it from an attack by Namor. The Squadron Supreme then made short work of Namor and the Defenders of the Deep.

During the War of the Realms storyline, the Squadron Supreme of America were summoned to Washington D.C. by Phil Coulson, who brought them up to speed on Malekith's invasion. They are shown fighting Rock Trolls and Frost Giants. Their origin is fully shown where its members are revealed to be simulacrums created by Mephisto and programmed by the Power Elite so that Phil Coulson can have them be a United States-sponsored superhero team. After the Squadron Supreme caused the Frost Giants to retreat, Phil Coulson sends them to Ohio which has become a battleground.

The Squadron Supreme are summoned to confront Black Panther when he infiltrates the Pentagon and confronts Phil Coulson. Hyperion states that the Squadron Supreme are the United States' sanctioned superhero team in light of the Avengers becoming an anti-American team. As Nighthawk states to Blur that the Black Panther will not run as he is under arrest, the Black Panther states to them that he does not know how they got their powers and that they are not the Squadron Supreme, as he even asked if they trust Phil Coulson. Before they can grab him, the Black Panther contacts Broo to teleport him away. As he disappears, the Black Panther states that Phil Coulson will not answer their questions and that the Avengers are not their enemies unless they force them to be.

During the Heroes Reborn storyline, reality has been somehow changed so that the Squadron Supreme of America are the America's premier superhero team and that the Avengers never existed. The Squadron Supreme are seen fighting the Masters of Doom consisting of Doctor Juggernaut, Black Skull, Silver Witch and All-Gog after their escape from the Negative Zone. The Squadron Supreme manages to repel the Masters of Doom with the fight being witnessed by President Phil Coulson. The Skrullian Skymaster was shown to be a member of this reality's Squadron Supreme before he was killed by Rogue to avenge Mystique's death. Nighthawk and Blur had a Secret Squadron team that consisted of Tom Thumb (who is an amalgam of both versions), Amphibian, Blue Eagle, Golden Archer, and Arcanna Jones. This group fought the Siege Society in London where Amphibian was beheaded by Baron Helmut Zemo, Golden Archer was killed by Hawkeye and Fire-Ant, Tom Thumb was subdued by Hawkeye, Arcanna Jones was killed by Silver Witch, and Golden Eagle was slain offscreen by Black Widow and Hawkeye who escape with Fire Ant using his special wings. Following the fight, Nighthawk, Blur, and Tom Thumb mourn their comrades at their funeral. The Squadron Supreme of America discuss their encounters with various heroes and concerns about their world being wrong. Putting aside their differences and without telling President Coulson, they gather clues and rule out suspects before eventually arriving in Wakanda, where they confront the Avengers. The Avengers battle and eventually defeat the Squadron Supreme of America. After Captain America, Star Brand, and Echo use the Pandemonium Cube to restore the original reality, the Squadron Supreme of America find their memories transferred to their counterparts in the Avengers' reality and struggle to find their place in an unfamiliar world.

Doctor Spectrum led Power Princess and Blur on a mission to arrest Red Widow. In a turn of events, Power Princess killed Doctor Spectrum and took his Power Prism as it is shown that Red Widow is working on brainwashing Hyperion.

Membership

Other versions

Marvel Zombies Supreme
A group of clones of the Squadron Supreme appear in the 2011 Marvel Zombies Supreme miniseries, which sees the members of the team infected with a zombie virus developed by a deranged geneticist.

In other media

Television
 The Squadron Supreme appears in The Super Hero Squad Show animated television series episode "Whom Continuity Would Destroy", consisting of Nighthawk, Power Princess, and Hyperion.
 The Squadron Supreme also appears in the Avengers Assemble animated television series, consisting of Hyperion, Zarda, Nighthawk, the Speed Demon, Doctor Spectrum, and Nuke. This version of the Squadron are aliens who ruled their home planet and destroyed it when the populace failed to blindly obey them. In the first season episode "Hyperion", the titular character arrives on Earth and plans to do the same to this world that he had done to his. While he is imprisoned by the Avengers, he later escapes and joins the Red Skull's Cabal until the latter betrays them. In the second season, the Squadron Supreme reunite and plan to become Earth's "protectors", which leads to them clashing with the Avengers. In the episode "Dark Avengers", the Squadron use the Reality Stone to make people believe they are heroes and the Avengers are villains. Eventually however, the Squadron Supreme are defeated and remanded to the Vault.

Collected editions

Earth-712

Earth-31916

Earth-616

References

External links
 Squadron Supreme at Don Markstein's Toonopedia. Archived from the original on September 14, 2017.
 Squadron Supreme from Marvel Wikia
 Squadron Supreme from Ultimate Pop Culture Wikia

Squadron Supreme
Characters created by John Buscema
Characters created by Roy Thomas
Comics characters introduced in 1971
Marvel Comics superhero teams
Marvel Comics titles